Severgreen is the ninth studio album by Croatian singer Severina. It was released in 2004 by Dallas Records. The album was released in a number of different colored "boxes", blue, orange, pink, purple, or yellow, each with a different photograph of Severina.

Track listing
"" (Adam and Seva)
"" (Brooch)
"" (Croatian Girl)
"" (Neither with You nor Without You)
"" (Alone on the Stage)
"" 
"" (Oh, Come On)
"" (Sorrows from a Dream)
"" (From My Head)
"" (Why Do You Ask Me What's Wrong Now?)

References

External links

2004 albums
Severina (singer) albums